Susana Rotker (3 July 1954 – 27 November 2000) was a Venezuelan journalist, columnist, essayist, and writer.

Biography
The daughter of Jewish immigrants, Susana Rotker graduated from Andrés Bello National University in Caracas in 1975, was an assistant professor at the University of Buenos Aires, and received a doctorate in Hispanic literature from the University of Maryland in 1989. She was a professor of Latin American literature and director of the Rutgers Center for Hemispheric Studies in New Jersey.

She was a noted film critic in her column "La gran ilusión" in the Caracas newspaper El Nacional.

Around 1979, she met the Argentine intellectual Tomás Eloy Martínez exiled in Venezuela, with whom she had a daughter Sol Ana in 1986, and with whom she lived until the traffic accident that cost Rotker her life in 2000. She resided in Highland Park, New Jersey.

Books
 Isaac Chocron y Elisa Lerner: Los Transgresores De La Literatura Venezolana Reflexiones Sobre La Identidad Judía, 1991, 
 Bravo Pueblo: Poder, Utopia Y Violencia, Fondo Editorial Nave Va., 
 Ensayistas De Nuestra América, Editorial Losada, 
 Ciudadanías del miedo, Nueva Sociedad, Caracas, 2000, 249 pp., 
 The Memoirs of Fray Servando Teresa de Mier, Oxford University Press
 The American Chronicles of Jose Marti: Journalism and Modernity in Spanish America, 
 , Fondo de cultura económica, 
 Citizens of Fear: Urban Violence in Latin America, Rutgers University Press, 
 Captive Women: Oblivion and Memory in Argentina, Minneapolis: University of Minnesota Press, 2002, 236 pp.,

Awards
In 1991 she received the Casa de las Américas Prize for her work La invención de la crónica about José Martí.

She was a Guest Scholar at the Woodrow Wilson International Center in 1997.

References

Further reading
 

1954 births
2000 deaths
20th-century Venezuelan women writers
Andrés Bello National University alumni
Venezuelan film critics
Road incident deaths in New Jersey
Rutgers University faculty
Academic staff of the University of Buenos Aires
University of Maryland, College Park alumni
Venezuelan educators
Venezuelan essayists
Venezuelan expatriates in the United States
Venezuelan Jews
Venezuelan women journalists
Venezuelan women essayists
Women film critics
Writers from Caracas
People from Highland Park, New Jersey
20th-century essayists
Venezuelan women educators